The 2021 UCI ProSeries is the second season of the UCI ProSeries, the second tier road cycling tour, below the UCI World Tour, but above the various regional UCI Continental Circuits.

The 2021 season initially consisted of 55 events of which 28 were one-day races (1.Pro) and 27 were stage races (2.Pro). There were 47 events in Europe, 5 in Asia, 2 in the United States and 1 in Argentina.

During January 2021, five races were cancelled and three were postponed, leaving 47 races in the 2021 UCI ProSeries season. Two races were added to the calendar (the Dwars door het Hageland and Eurométropole Tour), bringing the number of races scheduled to 49 in early February.

Events

Notes

References

 
2021
UCI ProSeries